Alessandro De Angelis (born 16 August 1959 in Cencenighe Agordino, Italy) is an Italian and Argentine physicist and astrophysicist. A Professor of Experimental Physics at the University of Padova and Professor Catedratico of Astroparticle Physics at IST Lisboa, he is mostly known for his role in the proposal, construction and data analysis of new telescopes for gamma-ray astrophysics. He is a member of  Istituto nazionale di fisica nucleare (INFN), Istituto nazionale di astrofisica (INAF), Italian Physical Society (SIF), International Astronomical Union (IAU), Gruppo2003.

Career 
De Angelis graduated in physics from the University of Padova in 1983 studying charmed particles produced in the LExan Bubble Chamber at the European Hybrid Spectrometer. Had a post-doctoral activity at CERN ending as a staff member in Ugo Amaldi's DELPHI experiment.
Back to Italy, since 1999 he works mostly to particle astrophysics. He participated to the design and construction of NASA's Fermi Gamma-ray Space Telescope and of the MAGIC Telescopes in the Canary Island of La Palma. He is principal investigator of the space project ASTROGAM and is among the proponents of the Southern Wide-field Gamma-ray Observatory (SWGO), a very-high-energy gamma-rays observatory to be constructed on the Andes. He proposed the mixing between gamma rays and axions in intergalactic magnetic fields.

From 2010 to 2011 he has been guest scientist at the Werner Heisenberg Max Planck Institute for Physics in Munich, and since 2014 has been for three years Director of Research at INFN.

He also works on popularization of science and on history and philosophy of physics, in particular in relation to cosmic rays and to the Galilei period. He is editor for Springer Nature in the area of History of Physics.

Prizes 
 Highly Cited Researcher, Thomson-Reuters/Clarivate, 2016
 Thomson-Reuters Award for belonging to the "top 1% researchers publishing in the field of Space Science over the [...] decade" 2001–2010, 2011
 American Astronomical Society's Bruno Rossi Prize with the Fermi LAT Team, 2011
 Highlight of the European Physical Society for the article "Nationalism and internationalism in science: the case of the discovery of cosmic rays", with P. Carlson, Eur. Phys. J. H 36, 309, 2010
 NASA Group Achievement Award, 2008

Honors

Books

  
   
     With prefaces by Ugo Amaldi and Telmo Pievani.
 
  With a preface by Francis Halzen.
 
  With a preface by Margherita Hack.

References 

1959 births
Academic staff of the University of Padua
Living people
20th-century Italian physicists
Italian astrophysicists
Argentine physicists
Argentine astrophysicists
Particle physicists
People associated with CERN